Last Chance to Breathe is the fifth studio album from the Christian rock band Spoken.

Critical reception

Awarding the album three stars for Christianity Today, Russ Breimeier states, "this is still a fine entry for the genre." Josh Taylor, giving the album three and a half stars at Jesus Freak Hideout, describes, "Last Time to Breathe is one tasty treat." Rating the album an eight out of ten from Cross Rhythms, Tony Cummings writes, "'Last Chance To Breathe' is well above average." Sarah Verno, indicating in a three and a half out of five review by The Phantom Tollbooth, says, "Last Chance to Breathe...is a reasonably solid album that’s worth checking out." Reviewing the album for The Phantom Tollbooth, Justin Wright comments, "this album will please old Spoken fans while allowing them to continue to reach out to new fans alike."

Track listing

Chart performance

References

Spoken (band) albums
2005 albums
Tooth & Nail Records albums